Alifa Chaabane Farouk (born October 17, 1946) is a Tunisian politician and diplomat. She was Tunisian ambassador to Germany.  Farouk was a member of the executive board of the National Union of Tunisian Women from 1989 to 1995.

Life and career 
Farouk was born in an outskirt town of Metline 30 kilometres north of Tunis. She studied  German  from 1966 to 1969, and  Political Science and Public International Law at the Louis-et-Maximilien University in Munich, Germany  where she finished with a Doctorate Degree in 1976. From 1979 to 1980, she studied International Company Law at the University of Paris II. After her studies in France, she worked briefly at Jeune Afrique group. Her diplomatic career began at the Tunisian embassy in Bonn, Germany where she worked from 1976 to 1979. Farouk was Director of the Investment Promotion Agency from 1981 to 1992 before taking charge of the  Minister of International Cooperation and Foreign Investments from 1992 to 1994 and later became the head of mission in the office of the President of the Republic from 1994 to 1995. In February 2010, she was appointed Tunisian Ambassador to Germany serving for only one year there. Farouk was Vice-president of the World Organization of Mediators and of the Association of Ombudsmen and Mediators of the Francophonie (AOMF). She assumed the office of the President of the Association of African Ombudsmen at the general assembly of the organization in Muldersdrift ( South Africa ) in 2005.

References 

1946 births
Living people
Tunisian diplomats
20th-century Tunisian women politicians
20th-century Tunisian politicians
20th-century Tunisian lawyers
Tunisian women lawyers